Jacarezinho is a municipality in the state of Paraná in Brazil, with around 39,000 inhabitants. It is situated at  near the Jacaré River and it is a major center for the region. Its economy is made up of 34% industries, 55% services (education plays a big part), 11% agriculture (sugar cane, coffee and cattle).  The city is the seat of the Roman Catholic Diocese of Jacarezinho.

References